Retinne  is a village of Wallonia and a district of the municipality of Fléron, located in the province of Liège, Belgium. 

It is just north of the centre of Fléron.

Notable people 
 Georges Jobé (1961-2012), Belgian motorcycle racer
 Éric Toussaint (1954-), Historian and political scientist

Image gallery 

Former municipalities of Liège Province
Fléron